The Junta of Commanders of the Armed Forces ruled Bolivia from 4 August 1981 through 4 September 1981. On 11 August 1981 the Junta formed a new cabinet. 

mil – military

ind – independent

MNR – Revolutionary Nationalist Movement

FSB – Bolivian Socialist Falange

ADN – Nationalist Democratic Action

Notes

Political history of Bolivia